Mount Hooker is located on the border of Alberta and British Columbia, Canada. It was named in 1827 by David Douglas after William Jackson Hooker. Until the turn of the century, Mount Hooker and the nearby Mount Brown were thought to be the highest mountains in the Canadian Rockies (see Hooker and Brown).

See also
List of peaks on the British Columbia–Alberta border

References

Three-thousanders of Alberta
Three-thousanders of British Columbia
Canadian Rockies